Artur Taimurazovich Kusov (born 3 May 1986) is a Russian former professional footballer.

Club career
He made his debut in the Russian Premier League in 2004 for FC Alania Vladikavkaz.

Personal life
He is the younger brother of Russian international Alan Kusov.

References

Russian footballers
FC Spartak Vladikavkaz players
FC SKA Rostov-on-Don players
Sportspeople from Vladikavkaz
Russian Premier League players
1986 births
Living people
Association football forwards
FC Kuban Krasnodar players
FC Mashuk-KMV Pyatigorsk players